Kąpiołki  is a village in the administrative district of Gmina Wolbrom, within Olkusz County, Lesser Poland Voivodeship, in southern Poland.

References

Villages in Olkusz County